Nidularium apiculatum var. serrulatum is a plant in the genus Nidularium. This plant is endemic to Brazil.

References

apiculatum var. serrulatum
Endemic flora of Brazil